Bacillus vallismortis is a species of bacteria, with type strain DV1-F-3 (5 NRRLB-14890).

References

Further reading

External links

LPSN
Type strain of Bacillus vallismortis at BacDive -  the Bacterial Diversity Metadatabase

vallismortis
Bacteria described in 1996